The Kanazawa Yuwaku Yumeji-kan Museum is a museum in Yuwaku Hot Spring, Kanazawa, Ishikawa Prefecture, Japan dedicated to the works of the artist Yumeji Takehisa.

History
The museum was established in 2000.

Architecture
The museum is housed in a two-story building. It features a shop.

Exhibitions
The ground floor of the museum displays the three muses immortalized by Yumeji, named Tamaki, Hikono and Oyo. The upper floor displays the temporary exhibitions about Yumeji's works.

Transportation
The museum is accessible by bus from Kanazawa Station of West Japan Railway Company.

See also
 List of museums in Japan

References

External links

 

Art museums and galleries in Japan
Art museums established in 2000
Buildings and structures in Kanazawa, Ishikawa
2000 establishments in Japan
Museums in Ishikawa Prefecture